"Our Love" is a song by American singer Natalie Cole. Released as a single from her 1977 album Thankful, it spent 2 weeks at number one on the Hot Soul Singles chart in January 1978.  It also was a hit on the pop charts, reaching number ten, and has become one of her most familiar songs. It was certified gold in 1978, selling over one million copies.

Charts

Weekly charts

Year-end charts

Certifications

Cover versions
R&B singer Mary J. Blige covered it on her 1997 album, Share My World.

References

1977 singles
Natalie Cole songs
Songs written by Marvin Yancy
1977 songs
Capitol Records singles
Rhythm and blues ballads
Soul ballads
1970s ballads